Dear Comrade is a 2019 Indian Telugu-language romantic action drama film written and directed by Bharat Kamma. It is produced by Mythri Movie Makers and Big Ben Cinemas. The film stars Vijay Deverakonda, Rashmika Mandanna, and Shruti Ramachandran. Principal photography of the film commenced in August 2018. The film was theatrically released on 26 July 2019 in Telugu and along with dubbed versions in Tamil, Malayalam, and Kannada.

Plot 

The movie begins with Chaitanya Krishna, aka Bobby, heavily drunk, dejected, and angry. He is unable to come to terms with the fact that his girlfriend Lilly doesn't want him in her life anymore.

The story now goes into flashback mode, where Bobby is a leftist student union leader at a college in Kakinada that deals with severe anger management issues. He's a rebel without a cause, like his grandfather Comrade Suryam. He fights with a local politician, Bulliah's brother, due to whom a girl from his college attempts suicide on repeated torture from him to reciprocate his love. He even spends a night in the lock-up with his friends over this. While returning, he runs into Lilly, aka Aparna Devi, who causes him a minor accident, and as compensation, Bobby takes away all her money to fix his bike. He returns home and gets to know that Lilly was, in fact, his childhood friend, (cousin of his neighbour's daughter Jaya) who has come to attend Jaya's wedding. Lilly keeps heartily teasing Bobby over his earlier infatuation with Jaya. During a local cricket match, Bobby discovers that Lilly is, in fact, a state-level cricket player. He gets thoroughly impressed by her and slowly starts to fall for her. During a small party held in the union office to celebrate their team's victory, Lilly sees Bobby getting into a heated argument with a student political leader, and despite her requests to walk away from it, Bobby engages in a fistfight. Lilly realises that Bobby has anger management issues and tries to tell him to handle and resolve conflicts internally rather than enter into fights with others. She also reveals that she had a brother who had lost his life a few years back in a college campus clash and that Bobby's campus fights brought back those painful memories.

During Jaya's marriage, Bobby confesses his love for Lilly. But she tells him that the two of them have different life paths to journey and that he'll probably forget her as soon as she goes away. Bobby isn't able to handle this rejection, and Lilly leaves without bidding goodbye to him. After she leaves, Bobby can't stop thinking about her and rides all night to Hyderabad to meet her and tell her that he wants to be her comrade in her life's journey. Confessing that she, too, has been thinking a lot about him, she reciprocates his feelings. But Lilly tells Bobby how she is scared of him due to his excessive aggression, but he calls it a minor issue and agrees to rectify it for her. Their love affair progresses passionately until one fateful day when Bobby is drawn into a fight with Bulliah's brother's gang yet again and unknowingly causes the accident of Bulliah's brother, who slips into Coma. Bulliah gets angered and tells his men to kill Bobby, and he gets seriously injured during the encounter with Bulliah's men inside his college campus, with Lilly witnessing everything and forced to go through the trauma of losing a loved one once again. When he wakes up in the hospital, Lilly starts advising and entreating him to give up his violent tendencies for the peace of mind of his loved ones. She gives him an ultimatum to choose immediately to either control his anger and continue to be with her or leave her forever. Bobby loses his temper at this demand since he feels nobody is willing to listen to his side of things and, in a fit of rage, pushes Lilly out of the hospital and tells her to get lost in front of family and friends.

Bobby later realises his mistake and tries to reach out to Lilly, but she asks him not to disturb her anymore and let her move on for good and focus on her career. He gets heart-broken and, on the advice of his grandfather, leaves home to travel and find his inner peace and true comrade self. He eventually joins a group of people who are working on a project on Sound healing. Three years after he had left home, Bobby and the team go to Hyderabad to meet a doctor to showcase their work, and while in the waiting hall, he sees Jaya and her husband. They ask him whether he came to visit Lilly in the hospital. That's when Bobby gets to know that Lilly had met with an accident during the day of National Selection and is sad and agitated upon seeing her condition in the psychiatric ward. He sneaks her out of the hospital and takes her on a road trip to Kerala to heal her both physically and emotionally. Her leg heals, and she slowly appears to return to her former cheerful self. He drops her back at her house and runs into the doctor who had been treating her. The doctor warns him that she may appear to be happy outside, but she has hidden pain inside. Bobby dismisses this, and as he leaves Lilly, he gives her his Digital voice recorder to listen to if at all she feels that she is in pain. Bobby and Lilly are then invited to their common friends’ marriage, where Lilly is visibly impressed by Bobby's newfound maturity enabling him to effortlessly forgive and party with Bulliah's brother and his gang. She asks Bobby to marry her since she's eager to start a life with him. But Bobby states that there is no urgency for their marriage and instead asks her to focus on her career goals now that she's physically fit. To his surprise, Lilly reveals that she has left cricket for good. She is angry at Bobby for persistently forcing her to go back to her cricketing life and walks away. Lilly increasingly feels that Bobby has forgotten the passionate love he once had for her. At the same time, Bobby starts to wonder why Lilly has suddenly lost all passion for cricket.

One day, Bobby spots Lilly's former teammate and friend Rubina, who now works in a tailoring shop. She tells Bobby the whole truth of what transpired in Lilly's life after he had left. During a high-profile tournament, Lilly's team won the cup, and she was also named the “best player”. The chief-guest and presenter of the awards, Ramesh Rao, who is a south-zone selector for BCCI, lusts for Lilly. He meets with Lilly in his office the next day and demands her to sleep with him to get selected for the national team. Lilly is visibly shaken and reduced to tears by this demand. Still, she refuses to lodge any complaint due to fear of confrontation, despite entreaties from her good friend Rubina in whom she had confided. But Rubina complains on Lilly's behalf anyway, and getting wind of this, Ramesh Rao barges into their change-room and physically assaults both Lilly and Rubina. Lilly, who gets even more shaken and distressed due to this incident, meets with an accident shortly afterwards while crossing the road in a daze. Due to her fractured leg and the sexual assault of Ramesh Rao, Lilly was now severely scarred mentally and slipped into psychological breakdown and depression. On finally coming to know of all this through Rubina, Bobby gets furious and beats Ramesh Rao black and blue with his comrade friends. He then comes to Lilly and breaks down in front of her apologising for ever having left her. Lilly is unaware of the reason for this sudden confession but is heartened by the fact that some of his old passion for her has returned. But Bobby then takes Lilly to the police station where his friends were waiting, lodging an official police complaint against Ramesh Rao on the sexual harassment incident. Lilly, suddenly realising the reason for Bobby's emotional turnaround, refuses to co-operate with his plans for taking strong punitive action against Ramesh Rao. She instead complains that everybody has only ever tried to force their own will on her while nobody has ever bothered to ask her what she really wants. Her own father had also discouraged her earlier when she told him about the incident, as he believed it would ruin the family's reputation. Her agitated father, who is now with her in the Police Station, escorts her back home away from a frustrated Bobby whose vigorous requests to her to stay back and fight for her rights like true comrades goes unheeded.

Seeing the old aggressive streak in Bobby again, Lilly is now convinced that Bobby's temperament had never really changed and that he only pities her present state rather than loving and respecting her. Despite Jaya's advice, she decides to meet up with a groom her family has arranged for her. Bobby comes into her house in the middle of this and tries to convince her one last time entreating her not to run away from her life and promising to Not to let her collapse like the comrade soviet union. But Lilly blames him for not being around when she really needed him years ago and that she now sees a future with the new groom. Much to Bobby's dismay, she tells him that she would completely forget him in a few years, just like he had done to her. A tearful Bobby leaves her place, flashing back to his life over the past few years in Ladakh, where he had attempted to find peace in life and heal his broken heart, but in vain. Lilly's memories had been with him every breath of the way. Ignorant of all this, Lilly gets confirmation of her marriage to be scheduled within the month and is suddenly consumed by the painful prospect of losing Bobby forever. She desperately reaches out for Bobby's old voice recorder that he had left for her as a hearing aid. But the recordings in it were all Bobby's own personal messages to her over their years of separation that revealed his passionate and undying love for Lilly. She is ecstatic, but it is soon cut short by the news that the video footage of Bobby assaulting Ramesh Rao has gone viral, and the media has now made it a national issue. Lilly and her family are now firmly thrust into the media's limelight. The Board of Control for Cricket in India appoints a four-member committee to investigate the allegations against Ramesh Rao.

The police officer in-charge of the sexual assault investigation, who is a friend of Ramesh Rao, arrests Bobby and incarcerates him. Bobby refuses to let the hook off Ramesh Rao despite being thrashed and threatened in custody. The officer also visits Lilly's family and tries to coerce Lilly to lie in exchange for the safe release of Bobby. So in her deposition before the BCCI committee, she reluctantly states that she wasn't sexually harassed and assaulted by Ramesh Rao, despite Bobby being present there and continuously urging her to take that one last step towards justice. Bobby is severely disillusioned by Lilly's defeatist stance and gives up the fight for justice. He apologises for all the trouble he has caused to everyone. He lies that he did all this out of some personal vengeance against Ramesh due to his anger management issues and that he only knew Lilly as a neighbour's distant relative and had seen her just a few times. This hurts Lilly badly, and she tries to hold onto Bobby while he was being escorted back by the police. But he tearfully pushes her away, stating that their journeys are so different that they can never meet. Ramesh Rao then goes on to insult both Bobby and Lilly in the court and demands an apology from Lilly for false allegations and defaming him and says that this was all just a cheap publicity stunt used by a mediocre player like her. Lilly, enraged by this and already hurt by Bobby's crestfallen lies, attacks Ramesh Rao in front of the committee and angrily confesses that he had indeed sexually harassed and assaulted her, abusing his position as a selector. She swears to Ramesh Rao that she would not only break into the national team but also captain it one day. Bobby gets to watch all this from the sidelines unseen by Lilly and is delighted to see the return of the passionate cricketer in her.  Later, when questioned by the media outside, Lilly faces them fearlessly and says that every woman should have a Comrade who supports her in her journey and instills courage in her to fight for her rights. She then desperately seeks out Bobby and tells him that she finally overcame her fears to nail Ramesh Rao and even beat him up in front of everyone. Bobby smilingly reveals that he did witness Aparna Devi coming to her own. Lilly then forces Bobby to take back his earlier hurtful statements as to their journeys being different. A beaming Bobby does so, and the two lovers reunite, having finally embraced their true selves. During the credits roll, Bobby drops Lilly at the National Cricket Academy and gives her a fist-bump reaffirming that she is his true comrade.

Cast 

 Vijay Devarakonda as Chaitanya Krishna Makineni "Bobby"
 Rashmika Mandanna as Aparna "Lilly" Devi  
 Shruti Ramachandran as Jaya, Lilly's cousin
 Raj Arjun as Ramesh Rao
 Suhas as Martin
 Vikas as Raghu
 Divya Sripada as Anitha, Raghu's girlfriend
 Vinay Mahadev as opposite gang
 Charuhasan as Bobby's grandfather
 Anand as Bobby's father
 Kalyani Natarajan as Bobby's mother
 Pratyusha Jonnalagadda as Rubina
 Tulasi as Jaya's mother
 Sanjay Swaroop as Lilly's father
 Ashrita Vemuganti as Lilly's mother
 Srikanth Iyyengar as Police Officer

Production

Development 
In May 2018, it was reported that Vijay Deverakonda will join with debutant director Bharat Kamma for a new film. The first look poster of the film was unveiled on Devarakonda's birthday, 9 May 2018, with the title Dear Comrade, also being announced. While sources claimed that the film will be a remake of Malayalam movie Comrade in America (2017) starring Dulquer Salmaan as the protagonist, the director and actor denied its connection with the movie. Rashmika Mandanna, was selected to play the female lead, collaborating with Deverakonda for the second time, after Geetha Govindam (2018). Vijay Devarakonda plays the lead role of a student leader, while Rashmika essayed the role of a female cricketer. After completing the pre-production work by its month end, the team planned to kickstart the film's shoot in June 2018, but was delayed further, in order to complete the shooting commitments, of the other lead actors, while the team used to finalise, other principal cast and crew. In July 2019, it was reported that Sai Pallavi was earlier chosen for the film's female lead. However, she rejected the script due to the lip-lock scenes between the lead actors.

Filming 
The film's pooja ceremony was launched on 2 July 2018. Apart from the film's cast and crew, M. M. Keeravani provided the first clap for the film while Chandra Sekhar Yeleti switched on the camera. Bharat handed the script to directors Sukumar and Koratala Siva. Principal photography began very soon after the launch. However, production further delayed, due to the actor's involvement in other projects. The film's second schedule took place in Kakinada in December 2018, after the completion of the first schedule. The shoot came to a halt, after Vijay faced an injury while boarding a running train, as a part of the film's scene. The actor also suffered from fever and exhaustion, while shooting the film, which led him to be hospitalised, which further delayed the film. Filming was completed on 28 April 2019.

Soundtrack

Release 
The film was originally scheduled to release on 31 May 2019, was postponed in order to avoid clash with Suriya's NGK. On 9 May 2019, Deverakonda announced that the film will be released on 26 July 2019 in Telugu, Tamil, Kannada and Malayalam languages.

The film was also dubbed and released in Hindi on YouTube by Goldmines Telefilms on 19 January 2020. The Hindi dubbed version crossed more than 307 million views on YouTube.

Marketing 
The official teaser of the film was released on 17 March 2019, landed in controversy, after both the lead actors being trolled over the kissing scene featured in the clip. Rashmika stated in response to the controversy, that since the particular scene in the film demanded a lip lock scene, it is a responsibility for an actor to do justice for the role. She further added, "No movie should be judged solely on the basis of a lip-lock scene. It should be seen as a whole."

A promotional event titled Dear Comrade Music Festival, took place across Bengaluru, Cochin, Chennai and Hyderabad, for the film's marketing purposes. The film's marketing team announced its collaboration with Airtel India, as their sponsor.

Reception

Critical response 
Hemanth Kumar of Firstpost said that the film is "an intense but uneven film". Giving the film a 3/5, he adds, "Dear Comrade is beautifully written and the love story between the two characters is sheer magic, but then it straddles between two worlds that are loosely held together" Sudhir Srinivasan of The New Indian Express gave the film a 4.5/5 by praising the movie for its direction and the acting of its leading roles. Writing for The Times of India, Suhas Yellapantula gave 3.5 stars and said that the film "makes you think, keeps you guessing and plays with your emotions. After the film, there's a good chance you'll walk out with your collar up and ready to raise your voice against anything that doesn't sit right with you — even if it's just for a while." Janani K of India Today wrote that "Vijay Deverakonda and Rashmika Mandanna's Dear Comrade is about the relationship between two contrasting characters. While the film addresses an important message on sexual harassment, it gets hidden under mass moments. Watch it for the performances. Director Bharat Kamma had a solid script in hand, and a relevant one at that." Sangeetha Devi Dundoo of The Hindu wrote, "Rashmika Mandanna and Vijay Deverakonda shine in director Bharat Kamma's film that underlines the importance of being a comrade". Karthik Kumar, in his review for Hindustan Times, gave 3.5 stars out of five and wrote that "Dear Comrade does tumble towards the end with a slightly below par climax, but it's still an effort you want to appreciate. The film, about life, love and facing our worst fears, achieves more than one can imagine, and that's what makes it a winner."

Box office
Dear Comrade collected around 18 crore on its opening day. It collected 30-33 crore in the first weekend. According to International Business Times, Dear Comrade grossed a total of 37.33 crores till the end of the year 2019.

Remake
Filmmaker Karan Johar has acquired the rights of producing a Hindi remake of the film.

References

External links 
 

2010s Telugu-language films
2019 action drama films
Indian action drama films
2019 films
Telugu films remade in other languages
Indian romantic drama films
2019 romantic drama films
Films about sexual harassment
Indian romantic action films
Mythri Movie Makers films